Tong Li or Tongli may refer to:

Tongli, a town in Suzhou, China
Tong Li Publishing, a publishing company in Taiwan
Tong Li, female Chinese pop/folk singer
Tom Lee Music, a Hong Kong musical instrument retailer pronounced "Tongli" in Mandarin

See also
Li Tong (disambiguation)